Dalpari (also Romanized as Dālparī) is a village in Nahr-e Anbar Rural District, Musian District, Dehloran County, Ilam Province, Iran. At the 2006 census, its population was 28, in 7 families.

References 

Populated places in Dehloran County